Abdi is one of three departments in Ouaddaï, a region of Chad. Its capital is Abdi.

Departments of Chad
Ouaddaï Region